Both Sides of Herman's Hermits is the second album released by the group in the UK. It was the fourth album released by MGM Records in the U.S. and Canada for the band. It was released in August 1966 in the U.S. and October 1966 in the UK Val Valentin was the recording supervisor. The original U.S. cover artwork was by Frank Frazetta.

The UK and U.S. versions differ drastically with different artwork and track listing: only five tracks featured on both versions. The UK version was re-released on CD in 2000 by Repertoire with bonus tracks that mostly combine the two albums. The artwork pictured is the US release.

Track listing

UK version 

Bonus Tracks (2000 Repertoire Re-release)
 "Kansas City Loving" (Jerry Leiber, Mike Stoller)
 "A Must to Avoid" (Barri, Sloan)
 "The Man With the Cigar" (Larry Kusik, Barry Richards)
 "Got a Feeling" (Fred Karger, Sid Wayne, Ben Weisman)
 "Hold On!"  (Barri, Sloan)
 "Oh! Mr. Porter" (George Le Brunn, Thomas Le Brunn)
 "The Future Mrs. 'Awkins" (Albert Chevalier)
 "Two Lovely Black Eyes" (Charles Coborn)
 "My Old Dutch" (Chevalier, Charles Ingle)

US version 
Side 1
 "This Door Swings Both Ways" (Don Thomas, Estelle Levitt)
 "Bus Stop" (Graham Gouldman)
 "For Love" (Keith Hopwood, Derek Leckenby, Harvey Lisberg)
 "Je suis anglais (L'autre jour)" (Ralph Bernet, Gilles Jérome)
 "Dial My Number" (Lester Van Dyke)

Side 2
 "The Future Mrs. 'Awkins" (Albert Chevalier)
 "Oh! Mr. Porter" (George Le Brunn, Thomas Le Brunn)
 "The Man With the Cigar" (Barry Richards, Larry Kusik)
 "Two Lovely Black Eyes" (Charles Coborn)
 "My Reservation's Been Confirmed" (Hopwood, Leckenby, Lisberg)
 "My Old Dutch" (Chevalier, Charles Ingle)

Note: The traditional songs "The Future Mrs. 'Awkins", "Oh! Mr. Porter", "Two Lovely Black Eyes", and "My Old Dutch" were all originally erroneously credited to Kenny Lynch, whose arrangements Herman's Hermits covered.

References

1966 albums
Herman's Hermits albums
Albums produced by Mickie Most
Albums with cover art by Frank Frazetta
MGM Records albums
EMI Columbia Records albums